Prashant Raj is a model and actor from Mumbai, India who debuted in Ram Gopal Varma's remake of Ramesh Sippy's Sholay, titled Ram Gopal Varma Ki Aag.

Career
Sachdev is a former model and a struggling from Mumbai, India who landed the role played by Amitabh Bachchan in Ramesh Sippy's Sholay, remade by Ram Gopal Varma as Ram Gopal Varma Ki Aag. 
His second film, Toss, was released 28 August 2009. It was also the debut vehicle for Roadies' Rannvijay Singh and Madhuurima, and the film co-stars Aarti Chhabria and Ashmit Patel. Both of his films have been disasters. First ad campaign was for Benzer. Worked in Event Management with Percept D'Mark (PDM India), Showdiff.

In Aag, he played the role of Raj, originally played by Amitabh Bachchan as Jai. The original name of the film was Ram Gopal Varma Ke Sholay, however, due to copyright concerns, the name had to be changed.

Appeared in several Lakme India Fashion Week shows in Mumbai and Delhi. Sachdev, who is 6'3", has done ramp and print campaigns in India, Sri Lanka, and Ecuador. He was on a team with model Sahil Shroff on the AXN Network's The Amazing Race Asia reality/adventure TV show, in their first Asian season.

Filmography
While gearing up to leave for Los Angeles, the role fell into his lap. Aag, as he puts it, was a stroke of luck while he was busy making plans.

Awards

References

External links 

https://web.archive.org/web/20070126002848/http://www.apunkachoice.com/celebrities/prashant_raj/ 
https://web.archive.org/web/20070927201528/http://www.mumbaimirror.com/net/mmpaper.aspx?page=article&sectid=30&contentid=20061202030920562b88a3efb 
https://web.archive.org/web/20161228065804/http://www.rgvkiaag.com/ 
 
https://web.archive.org/web/20090902111957/http://calcuttatube.com/toss-prashant-raj-is-back/

1984 births
Indian male models
Indian male film actors
The Amazing Race contestants
Living people